Rusty Jones is the name of:

Rusty Jones (American football), Chicago Bears strength and conditioning coordinator
Rusty Jones (guitarist), guitarist for The Monroes band
Rusty Jones (musician) (1942–2015), American jazz drummer

See also 
Rusty Jones (company), American rustproofing solution provider